Na'eem Jeenah is a well-known academic and leader in the Muslim community and the anti-capitalist and anti-war movements in South Africa.

Biography
Na'eem Jeenah is currently the Executive Director of the Afro-Middle East Centre, a research institute dedicated to studying the Middle East and North Africa and relations between that region and the rest of Africa. He has also taught Political Studies at the University of the Witwatersrand in Johannesburg.

Jeenah was born in the South African coastal city of Durban. Under South Africa's Apartheid Population Registration Act he was classified "Indian". He became involved with political protests in the 1980s when, while he was still in secondary school, the country erupted into almost a decade of nationwide student protests, followed by widespread resistance in trade unions and communities. 

After school, Jeenah entered the highly politicized University of Natal Black Section, the medical school (only for black students) that was attached to the (predominantly white and Coloured) University of Natal. Through his activities with the Muslim Students Association of South Africa and the Muslim Youth Movement of South Africa, he was thrust into the political limelight as these organizations became increasingly involved in the anti-Apartheid struggle. 

After spending two years at the medical school and a year at the University of Durban-Westville, Jeenah dropped out of university to find a job and get married. He married Shamima Shaikh, whom he met for the first time when the couple was arrested during a trade union-led consumer boycott campaign against White businesses. Shaikh became one of South Africa's most well-known Islamic feminists. She died in January 1998, leaving Jeenah with two sons.

Jeenah rose in the ranks of the Muslim Youth Movement of South Africa to become its national general secretary and, later, its president. He was also, for a period, the editor of the Movement's mouthpiece newspaper, Al-Qalam. He steered the movement in a way that increased its political activism during the anti-apartheid struggle. He also, along with Shaikh and others, founded the Muslim Youth Movement Gender Desk, the foremost organization of Islamic feminism in South Africa at the time. It was also during the 1980s that Jeenah helped his organization and the Muslim community in South Africa to get involved in inter-faith activities - particularly through the South African chapter of the World Conference on Religion and Peace. Working with the latter, he was also a member of the drafting committee of a landmark document produced during South Africa's constitution-drafting period called the Declaration on Religious Rights and Responsibilities.

His other employment included: the Congress of South African Trade Unions; the Southern African NGO Network (SANGONet); the University of the Witwatersrand; and the Freedom of Expression Institute.

In 1994, on the eve of South Africa's first democratic elections, Jeenah's family joined those in South Africa who had sacrificed family members for the struggle: his brother, Mohseen Jeenah, a student leader and anti-Apartheid activist, was gunned down in the early hours of the morning of 17 January by Apartheid police.

Jeenah and Shaikh undertook the hajj pilgrimage in 1997, while Shaikh was already suffering from the effects of breast cancer, which had affected her severely. On the couple's return they authored a book about their pilgrimage called Journey of Discovery: A South African Hajj. Soon after, they founded the Johannesburg-based Muslim community radio station called The Voice, which exposed radical and progressive Muslim voices to the Muslim community and became a flagship for women's rights, inter-religious tolerance and anti-imperialist rhetoric. It also gave a voice to refugee communities and social movements. Shaikh died just four months after the station went on air.

Jeenah's career has been a checkered one, spanning the NGO sector, academia, religious organizations and journalism. Currently working as executive director of the Afro-Middle East Centre, he is also a board member of the Denis Hurley Peace Initiative and an advisory board member of the World Congress for Middle Eastern Studies. He is often interviewed as an expert by various media on issues related to the Middle East, Islam and the Muslim world, Muslims in South Africa, Islamic Feminisms, political Islam, freedom of expression and various other issues. An experienced journalist, he also wrote for a number of publications and reported for a network of radio stations in the US. He is also a monthly columnist for the South African newspaper Al-Qalam.

Jeenah was named in December 2000 on the Mail & Guardian’s "Hot Shit 100 List" of people "Making their mark in the new millennium" and, in 2006, he was included on that newspaper's "100 young people you must take out to lunch".

Publications

Books
 
  (Booklet)

Some journal articles and chapters
 
 
  Pdf.
  Pdf.
 
  Pdf.

See also
Shamima Shaikh

References
Afro-Middle East Centre
Na'eem Jeenah
Journey of Discovery: A South African Hajj

External links
Afro-Middle East Centre
Na'eem Jeenah Blog
Muslim Youth Movement of South Africa

Academic staff of the University of the Witwatersrand
South African people of Indian descent
South African Muslim activists